Rimrock is an unincorporated community in Yakima County, Washington, United States, located approximately 22 miles west of Yakima on the Tieton River, adjacent to Rimrock Lake.

The community was named for nearby Rimrock Lake, a seven mile long dammed reservoir on the Tieton River.

Rimrock is served by Tieton State Airport, a grass airstrip located 2 miles south of Rimrock.

References

Unincorporated communities in Washington (state)
Unincorporated communities in Yakima County, Washington